James Sugira (born 2 February 1997) is a Rwandan long-distance runner.

In 2014, he competed in the boys' 1500 metres event at the 2014 Summer Youth Olympics held in Nanjing, China.

In 2017, he competed in the senior men's race at the 2017 IAAF World Cross Country Championships held in Kampala, Uganda. He finished in 49th place.

In 2018, he represented Rwanda at the 2018 Commonwealth Games held in Gold Coast. He competed in the men's 5000 metres event and he finished in 7th place.

References

External links 
 

Living people
1997 births
Place of birth missing (living people)
Rwandan male long-distance runners
Rwandan male cross country runners
Athletes (track and field) at the 2014 Summer Youth Olympics
Commonwealth Games competitors for Rwanda
Athletes (track and field) at the 2018 Commonwealth Games